The 1989–90 Wessex Football League was the fourth season of the Wessex Football League. The league champions for the first time were Romsey Town. Runners-up Newport (IOW) moved up to the Southern League after this season.

For sponsorship reasons, the league was known as the Medisport Wessex League.

League table
The league consisted of one division of 19 clubs, increased from 17 the previous season despite Bashley having joined the Southern League. Three new clubs joined:
B.A.T. Sports, joining from the Hampshire League.
Bemerton Heath Harlequins, a merger of Bemerton Athletic (Wiltshire League), Moon F.C. (Salisbury & District League) and Bemerton Boys (Mid-Wilts League).
Fleet Town, joining from the Chiltonian League.

References

Wessex Football League seasons
9